Inger Elisabeth Stilling Pedersen (26 July 1929 – 20 March 2017) was a Danish politician, who was a member of the Folketing for the Christian People's Party from 1973 to 1979 and again from 1984 to 1994.

Background
Pedersen graduated as a teacher from Århus Seminarium in 1961, and worked as a teacher at Nyvangsskolen in Randers.

Political career
Pedersen's first political work was as a member of the Parish council of Sankt Peder's Parish in Randers, where she sat from 1965 to 1978. Pedersen was elected into parliament at the 1973 Danish general election, and was reelected in 1975 and 1977. She did not get elected at the 1979 election. It wasn't until the 1984 election that she entered parliament again. She remained in parliament until 1994. After her parliamentary work she became a councillor in the parish council of Kristrup Parish near Randers, entering the council in 1996.

In 1988–1989, Pedersen was a part of a proposal to dismantle Freetown Christiania. The proposal was voted down in the Folketing with just 22 votes for (Christian People's Party, Centre Democrats and Progress Party) and 110 against.

References

External links 
 Biography on the website of the Danish Parliament (Folketinget)

1929 births
2017 deaths
People from Syddjurs Municipality
Danish schoolteachers
Christian Democrats (Denmark) politicians
20th-century Danish women politicians
Women members of the Folketing
Members of the Folketing 1973–1975
Members of the Folketing 1975–1977
Members of the Folketing 1977–1979
Members of the Folketing 1984–1987
Members of the Folketing 1987–1988
Members of the Folketing 1988–1990
Members of the Folketing 1990–1994